Chemistry Research Laboratory is a facility at the University of Oxford in England. It is part of the Department of Chemistry in the University.

Queen Elizabeth II opened the building on 20 February 2004, which replaced the older Dyson Perrins Laboratory not far away in the University's Science Area. It has five floors covering approximately 17,000 sq.m of laboratory and office space and cost £60 million to construct. The money was raised with grants from the JIF, Wolfson Foundation, EP Abraham Trust, Thomas Swan, the family of Landon T. Clay, the Salters' Company and a £20 million partnership with IP2IPO.

The building is effectively split into two parts, the southern side of the building is given over to offices which house both academic and administrative staff, whereas the northern side of the building houses the laboratories and write up areas. Splitting the two sides, there is a canteen on the lower ground floor, which can be crossed via the use of bridges on higher floors.

The Laboratory is located on the corner of South Parks Road and Mansfield Road, to the south of the main Science Area.

See also
 Department of Chemistry, University of Oxford

References

External links
 Chemistry Research Laboratory official website
 Organic Chemistry at the University of Oxford

2004 establishments in England
School buildings completed in 2004
Departments of the University of Oxford
University and college laboratories in the United Kingdom
Chemistry laboratories